Jurmana is a 1979 Hindi romantic drama film. It was produced by Debesh Gosh and directed by Hrishikesh Mukherjee. The film stars Amitabh Bachchan, Raakhee, Vinod Mehra, Shreeram Lagoo, A. K. Hangal, Asrani, Farida Jalal, Keshto Mukherjee and Asit Sen. The lyrics were written by Anand Bakshi and the music was composed by R. D. Burman.

Plot 
Inder Saxena is a building contractor from Delhi with an attitude that money is the foremost thing in the world. His maternal uncle persuades a reluctant Inder to visit and supervise a project's progress at Pratapgarh. Once there, he meets his college mate Prakash (Vinod Mehra), his professor Daya Shankar Sharma (Shreeram Lagoo) and his daughter Rama (Raakhee). Inder sets his eyes on Rama, but Prakash, secretly admiring Rama, tells Inder (Amitabh Bachchan) that she is the kind of girl who can't be lured with the power of money. But, Inder has a firm perception that women want only money and bets Prakash that he will lure Rama with his money. After everything from his bag of tricks fails, he publishes a book of her poems and gifts it to her. This gesture surprises Rama and she is very delighted. One day, Inder asks Rama to accompany him. Rama promises him and lies to her father about seeing off Laila (Farida Jalal). Upon learning the truth, Daya Shankar unexpectedly drops in with Prakash at Inder's house, finds Rama in his bedroom and scorns her for lying. Rama leaves the house forever and while heading towards Delhi and is robbed, for which she has to get off of the train. Distressed Rama gets the help of Station Master Nandalal (Asrani), who shelters her in his house. Coincidentally, the same train meets with an accident. Assuming an unrecognizable damaged body to be Rama, the police send a letter to Daya Shankar about her death, shocking everyone. Inder, feeling guilty for the incident, believes that Rama is alive and searches for her. Meanwhile, Rama learns singing to forget her sorrows and becomes a renowned singer. One day, Inder hears her singing on the radio, finds her out and informs Prakash. Eventually with all misunderstandings and differences settled, Rama and Inder come together.

Cast 
Amitabh Bachchan – Inder Saxena
Raakhee – Rama Sharma
Vinod Mehra – Prem Prakash Trivedi
Dr. Shreeram Lagoo – Prof. Dayashankar Sharma
Asrani – Nandlal Chaturvedi
A. K. Hangal – Pt. Prabhakar Chaturvedi, Nandlal's Mamaji
Farida Jalal – Laila
Ashit Sen – Dr. Kabir
Keshto Mukherjee – Babu Ram
Yunus Parvez – Lalaji
Moolchand – Lala's Brother-In-Law
Brahm Bhardwaj – Inder's Mamaji
[[Manju Asrani|manju asrani}
Meenaxi Anand
Jagjit Uppal
Raj Verma
Ahmer Azmi

Crew 
 Director – Hrishikesh Mukherjee
 Story – Bimal Dutta
 Screenplay – Bimal Dutta
 Dialogue – Rahi Masoom Reza
 Producer – Debesh Ghosh
 Production Company – Lokenath Chitramandir
 Cinematographer – Jaywant Pathare
 Editor – Subhash Gupta
 Art Director – Ajit Banerjee
 Costume and Wardrobe – M. R. Bhutkar, Babu Ghanekar
 Choreographer – Satyanarayan
 Music Director – Rahul Dev Burman
 Lyricist – Anand Bakshi
Playback Singers – Lata Mangeshkar, Manna Dey, Rahul Dev Burman, Asha Bhosle

Awards 

 27th Filmfare Awards:

Nominated

 Best Director – Hrishikesh Mukherjee
 Best Actress – Raakhee
 Best Supporting Actress – Farida Jalal
 Best Lyricist – Anand Bakshi for "Saawan Ke Jhoole Pade Hai"

Soundtrack

External links 
 

1979 films
1970s Hindi-language films
Films scored by R. D. Burman
Films directed by Hrishikesh Mukherjee